Susanta Singh (born 17 March 1973) is an Indian politician from Bhatli constituency. He is a member of Biju Janata Dal and current MLA.

References

1973 births
Biju Janata Dal politicians
Living people
Members of the Odisha Legislative Assembly